Rhadiodromus is a genus of dicynodont from Middle Triassic (Anisian) Donguz Formation of Russia.

Kannemeyeriiformes
Anisian genera
Triassic synapsids of Asia
Triassic Russia
Fossils of Russia
Fossil taxa described in 1951
Taxa named by Ivan Yefremov
Anomodont genera